The dorsal cuneonavicular ligaments consist of fibrous bands that join the dorsal surface of the navicular bone to the dorsal surfaces of the three cuneiform bones.

Ligaments of the lower limb